Happily Ever After: Fairy Tales for Every Child is an American anthology animated television series that premiered on March 12, 1995 on HBO. Narrated by Robert Guillaume, the series aired 39 episodes from 1995 to 2000. Reruns continue to air on HBO Family and
the show is available to stream on HBO Max.

Plot
Each episode details a classic story in different cultures, which contains characters voiced by famous actors, actresses, comedians, singers, rappers, dancers, models, political activists, athletes, stunt performers, and other famous celebrities.

Episodes

Season 1 (1995)

Season 2 (1997)

Season 3 (1999–2000)

Home media
Most episodes of Happily Ever After: Fairy Tales for Every Child were released on VHS by Random House Home Video, and, later HBO Home Video, but only a few episodes were released on DVD. There was one DVD with four episodes ("Pinocchio", "The Pied Piper", "The Golden Goose", and "Mother Goose: A Rapping and Rhyming Special") and one DVD with only one episode ("Robinita Hood"). In the United Kingdom, there are four DVDs with three episodes on each.

All 39 episodes are streaming on HBO Max.

References

External links
 
 

1990s American animated television series
1990s American anthology television series
1990s American black cartoons
1995 American television series debuts
2000s American animated television series
2000s American anthology television series
2000s American black cartoons
Witchcraft in television
2000 American television series endings
American children's animated anthology television series
American children's animated education television series
American children's animated fantasy television series
English-language television shows
HBO original programming
Reading and literacy television series
Television shows based on fairy tales
Television series by Hyperion Pictures
Television series by Home Box Office